Sloanea acutiflora is a species of plant in the Elaeocarpaceae family. It is endemic to Suriname.

References

Flora of Suriname
acutiflora
Vulnerable plants
Taxonomy articles created by Polbot